Enrique Lago Zugadi is a Chilean Anglican bishop. Since 2018 he has been Bishop of Concepción in the 40th Province of the Anglican Communion, namely the Anglican Church of Chile. Lago is the son-in-law of the last English-born Bishop of Chile, Colin Bazley.

References

Living people
21st-century Anglican bishops in South America
Chilean Anglicans
Anglican bishops of Concepción
Year of birth missing (living people)